Trepobates is a genus of water striders in the family Gerridae. There are 12 described species in Trepobates.

Species
These 12 species belong to the genus Trepobates:

 Trepobates becki Drake & Harris, 1932
 Trepobates carri Kittle, 1982
 Trepobates floridensis Drake & Harris, 1928
 Trepobates inermis Esaki, 1926
 Trepobates knighti Drake & Harris, 1928
 Trepobates panamensis Drake & Hottes, 1952
 Trepobates pictus (Herrich-Schaeffer, 1847)
 Trepobates polhemi Kittle, 1982
 Trepobates subnitidus Esaki, 1926
 Trepobates taylori (Kirkaldy, 1899)
 Trepobates trepidus Drake & Harris, 1928
 Trepobates vazquezae Drake & Hottes, 1951

References

External links

 

Trepobatinae
Gerromorpha genera
Articles created by Qbugbot